The following teams and players took part in the women's volleyball tournament at the 1972 Summer Olympics, in Munich.

Rosters

Mercedes Pérez
 Ana Díaz
 Mercedes Pomares
 Mercedes Roca
 Nelly Barnet
 Margarita Mayeta
 Claritza Herrera
 Nurys Sebey
 Miriam Herrera
 Claudina Villaurrutia
 Evelina Borroto
 Mavis Guilarte
Head coach
 Eugenio George

Irena Svobodová
 Elena Moskalová-Poláková
 Ludmila Vindušková
 Anna Mifková
 Jana Vápenková
 Jana Semecká
 Mária Mališová
 Hana Vlasáková
 Hilda Mazúrová
 Dora Jelínková
 Ivana Moulisová
 Darina Kodajová
Head coach

Judit Kiss-Gerhardt
 Éva Sebők-Szalay
 Ágnes Torma
 Emerencia Siry-Király
 Lucia Bánhegyi-Radó
 Ilona Makláry-Buzek
 Katalin Eichler-Schadek
 Judit Schlégl-Blaumann
 Emőke Énekes-Szegedi
 Judit Fekete
 Mária Gál
 Zsuzsa Bokros-Török
Head coach

Katsumi Matsumura
 Noriko Yamashita
 Takako Iida
 Sumie Oinuma
 Makiko Furukawa
 Seiko Shimakage
 Michiko Shiokawa
 Toyoko Iwahara
 Takako Shirai
 Mariko Okamoto
 Yaeko Yamazaki
 Keiko Hama
Head coach

Ryom Chun-Ja
 Kang Ok-Sun
 Hwang He-Suk
 Kim Yeun-Ja
 Kim Su-Dae
 Jong Ok-Jin
 Kim Zung-Bok
 Kim Myong-Suk
 Ri Chun-Ok
 Jang Ok-Rim
 Paek Myong-Suk
Head coach

Kim Chung–Han
 Yu Kyung-Hwa
 Yoon Young-Nae
 Yu Jung–Hyae
 Jo Hea-Chung
 Lee In-Sook
 Kim Kun–Bong
 Lee Jung-Ja
 Lee Soon-Bok
 Kim Young-Ja
 Kim Eun–Hie
Head coach

Lyudmila Buldakova
 Vera Galushka-Duyunova
 Inna Ryskal
 Roza Salikhova
 Nina Smoleeva
 Galina Leontyeva
 Lyudmila Borozna
 Tatyana Gonobobleva
 Tatyana Ponyayeva-Tretyakova
 Lyubov Turina
 Tatyana Sarycheva
 Nataliya Kudreva
Head coach
 Givi Akhvlediani

Erika Heucke
 Ingrid Lorenz
 Traute Schäfer
 Annedore Richter
 Ursula Westphal
 Margret Stender
 Regina Pütz
 Rike Ruschenburg
 Marianne Lepa
 Annette Ellerbracke
 Birgit Pörner
Head coach

References

1972